The Te-Moak Tribe of Western Shoshone Indians of Nevada is a federally recognized tribe of Western Shoshone Indians in northeastern Nevada.

History
The tribe organized under the 1934 Indian Reorganization Act. Western Shoshone elected a traditional council, led by Chief Muchach Temoak and his descendants, to create the new governments; however, the United States refused to recognize the traditional council and created the Te-Moaks Bands Council. Traditionalists did not feel adequately represented by this council and created the United Western Shoshone Legal Defense and Education Association, now known as the Sacred Lands Association in 1974. The traditionalists argued before the Indian Claims Commission (ICC) that the Te-Moak Bands Council did not speak for them and the tribe never gave up their title to their traditional lands. Their claims and appeal were rejected in 1979, when the ICC ruled that the Western Shoshone lost title to their lands in the Treaty of Ruby Valley in 1863. In 1980 the courts ruled that the lands were not ceded in 1863 but were lost on 6 December 1979. The tribe is still fighting to reclaim their traditional lands today.

The tribe's corporate charter was approved in 1938 and their current constitution was amended in 1982.

Today
The Te-Moak Tribe Council is headquartered in Elko, Nevada. The tribe is composed of four constituent bands. Their constitution allows for an unlimited number of reservations and Indian colonies to join the tribe.

Battle Mountain Band

Traditionally, they are the Tonomudza/Tonammutsa (Donammuzi) band of Western Shoshone. Their separate parcels of land total . Current reservation population is 165 and total tribal enrollment is 516. Their current band council includes:

Lydia Johnson, Chairman
Florine Maine, Vice Chair
Delbert Holley
Joseph Holley
Emerson Winap
Vacant Seat

Elko Band

They govern  of federal trust lands. Tribal enrollment is 1,143. Only 6% of the band graduated from high school and their average per capita annual income is $7,000. They are headquartered in Elko, Nevada and their current band council is as follows:

David Decker, Chairman
Davis Gonzales, Vice Chairman
Gerald Temoke
Nick Knight
Vernon Thompson
Leta Jim
Vacant.

South Fork Band

Their current band council is as follows:

Tyler Reynolds, Chairman
Alice Tybo, Vice Chairman
Brandon Reynolds
Dallas Smales
Gilbert Temoke
Vacant

Wells Band

Traditionally, they are the Kuiyudika band of Western Shoshone, after a desert plant used for food; within this group were at least two other smaller groups, the Doyogadzu Newenee (end-of-the-mountain people) and the Waiha-Muta Newenee (fire-burning-on ridge people). Clover Valley served as a rendezvous spot among these small Newe bands. Their headquarters is in Wells, Nevada. 39 members live on the reservation, and total band enrollment is 177. Their current band council is as follows:

Casey Franco, Chairman
Steve Brady, Vice-Chairman
Harvey Healy
Steve Johnny

Notable Te-Moak Shoshone
Ned Blackhawk, a Te-Moak historian and professor at Yale University

Notes

References
 Clemmer, Richard O. and Omer C. Stewart. "Treaties, Reservations, and Claims." D'Azevedo, Warren L., Volume Editor. Handbook of North American Indians, Volume 11: Great Basin. Washington, DC: Smithsonian Institution, 1986. .
 Pritzker, Barry M. A Native American Encyclopedia: History, Culture, and Peoples. Oxford: Oxford University Press, 2000. .
 Thomas, David Hurst, Lorann S. A. Pendleton, and Stephen C. Cappannari. "Western Shoshone." D'Azevedo, Warren L., Volume Editor. Handbook of North American Indians, Volume 11: Great Basin. Washington, DC: Smithsonian Institution, 1986. .

External links
Te-Moak Tribe of Western Shoshone, official website
Te-Moak Tribe News Blog

Western Shoshone
American Indian reservations in Nevada
Geography of Elko County, Nevada
Geography of Lander County, Nevada
Native American tribes in Nevada
Federally recognized tribes in the United States